Michael Ammermüller (born 14 February 1986) is a racing driver from Germany. After competing in various junior formulae, he became a test and reserve driver for the Red Bull Racing Formula One team in the 2007 season. Following this, he represented Germany in the final two seasons of the A1 Grand Prix series in 2007-08 and 2008-09, before competing for two seasons in ADAC GT Masters. In 2012, he began competing in the Porsche Supercup series for Walter Lechner Racing. He won three consecutive seasons, having won in 2017, 2018 and 2019.

Career
In 2004 he drove the number three car in German Formula Renault, as well as competing in Formula Renault 2000 Eurocup. In 2006, he competed in the GP2 Series for Arden International.

As a member of the Red Bull Junior Team, after Christian Klien was dropped by the Red Bull Racing Formula One team for the final three races of the  season, the team's third driver, Robert Doornbos, was promoted to the second race seat. This left a vacancy in the team, and Ammermüller was promoted to the position of third driver for the last three races of the season. He tested the car for the first time on 14 September, driving the distance necessary for an FIA Super Licence.

Ammermüller's 2007 GP2 Series season was disrupted by injury, and he was rested in favour of Sébastien Buemi.  However, Sebastian Vettel's move to the Scuderia Toro Rosso F1 team left his Formula Renault 3.5 Series seat vacant, which Ammermüller took. In 2008, he raced in the International Formula Master series.

A1 Grand Prix
In 2007-08, Ammermüller drove in A1 Grand Prix for Germany. In the 2007-08 season's third race at Sepang, he collided with three cars at turn two in three separate incidents, the first of which took 3rd position from Canada's Robert Wickens in the sprint race. It was deemed avoidable contact, and as such, Ammermüller was demoted to 16th, with Wickens reclaiming 3rd.  In the feature race, he collided again, this time with Britain's Oliver Jarvis. He was given a drive-through penalty. Despite this, he made contact at turn two once again, with Czech Republic's Erik Janis, and as a result was disqualified from the race. On the back of these incidents, he was given the nickname "Hammermüller".

Despite the disqualification, Ammermüller scored his maiden victory three weeks later at Zhuhai.

Racing record

Career summary

† As Ammermüller was a guest driver, he was ineligible to score points.
* Season still in progress.

Complete Formula One participations
(key)

Complete GP2 Series results
(key) (Races in bold indicate pole position) (Races in italics indicate fastest lap)

Complete Formula Renault 3.5 Series results
(key) (Races in bold indicate pole position) (Races in italics indicate fastest lap)

Complete A1 Grand Prix results
(key) (Races in bold indicate pole position) (Races in italics indicate fastest lap)

Complete Porsche Supercup results
(key) (Races in bold indicate pole position) (Races in italics indicate fastest lap)

References

External links

1986 births
Living people
People from Passau (district)
Sportspeople from Lower Bavaria
Racing drivers from Bavaria
German racing drivers
GP2 Series drivers
A1 Team Germany drivers
German Formula Renault 2.0 drivers
Formula Renault Eurocup drivers
Italian Formula Renault 2.0 drivers
International Formula Master drivers
Karting World Championship drivers
World Series Formula V8 3.5 drivers
Porsche Supercup drivers
Blancpain Endurance Series drivers
ADAC GT Masters drivers
Deutsche Tourenwagen Masters drivers
Carlin racing drivers
Arden International drivers
ART Grand Prix drivers
Jenzer Motorsport drivers
Team Rosberg drivers
Trident Racing drivers
Walter Lechner Racing drivers
A1 Grand Prix drivers
Super Nova Racing drivers
Nürburgring 24 Hours drivers
Saintéloc Racing drivers
Porsche Carrera Cup Germany drivers
Phoenix Racing drivers